Joseph Matthews (1849 - November 11, 1912) was a sailor in the United States Navy who received the Medal of Honor for bravery.

Biography
Matthews was born 1849 in Malta. After immigrating to the United States, he joined the navy. For his actions, he received the Medal of Honor on October 18, 1884.

He died on November 11, 1912, and he is buried in Palmetto Cemetery, Brunswick, Georgia.

Medal of Honor citation
Rank and organization: Captain of the Top, U.S. Navy. Born: 1849, Malta. Accredited to: Pennsylvania. G.O. No.: 326, 18 October 1884.

Citation:

For courageous conduct in going over the stern of the U.S.S. Constitution at sea, 13 February 1879, during a heavy gale, and cutting the fastenings of the ship's rudder chains.

See also

List of Medal of Honor recipients during peacetime

References

External links

1849 births
1912 deaths
United States Navy Medal of Honor recipients
United States Navy sailors
People from Pennsylvania
Foreign-born Medal of Honor recipients
Burials in Georgia (U.S. state)
Non-combat recipients of the Medal of Honor